McManus MPB is a 1976 Australian television film which was the pilot for a TV series.

Plot
The daughter of the Russian Consul vanishes. Sergeant McManus of the Missing Persons Bureau is sent to find her.

References

External links
McManus at IMDb
McManus MPB at AustLit

Australian television films